The Soledad Fire was a wildfire that burned  south of Agua Dulce and northeast of Santa Clarita in Los Angeles County, California in the United States during the 2020 California wildfire season. The fire started on July 5, 2020 and caused the complete closure of State Route 14 in both directions throughout the day as the fire grew to 1,498 acres. The fire also at a point threatened over 4,795 structures, although only 9 homes were formally threatened by the direct fireline. The cause of the fire is currently under investigation.

Events
First reported at around 3:30 pm on Sunday, July 5, off of State Route 14 on the south side of the highway, the Soledad Fire was seen only burning a single acre. However within several hours would rapidly expand to over 800 acres due to the hot, dry weather conditions and the topography of the area. State Route 14 was soon closed between Soledad Canyon Road and Escondido Canyon Road throughout the day as the fire at one point crossed the major thoroughfare as it rapidly burned to the northeast. Mandatory evacuation orders were put in place for neighborhoods from Agua Dulce Canyon Road to Briggs and Soledad Canyon to the 14 Freeway that remained in place throughout the day. By evening time, the fire was reported to be over 1,100 acres and 0% contained.

On Monday, July 6, very little fire activity was observed as the flame front had largely died down due to the heavy assault from fire personnel and cooler overnight weather conditions. Due to this, the mandatory evacuations of the affected areas were lifted at 2 pm, however fire personnel advised that the situation could still change dramatically at any moment due to the topography of the land and as well as the consistent wind in the area. Northbound lanes of State Route 14 were now opened, however the southbound lanes still remained closed for firefighting operations to continue. No fire activity was seen the following days as containment of the fireline grew and on July 10 the Soledad Fire was declared 100% contained by firefighters.

Impact
At the fire's height, at least 4,795 structures were under threat including 9 homes immediately within the rural area of the fire line. 40 residents were placed under a mandatory evacuation order. Over 500 fire personnel were called to fight the fire, and one firefighter sustained a minor injury.

The fire also produced a substantial smoke column that could be seen throughout the Los Angeles area, causing health officials to advise residents to remain indoors as the heavy smoke prompted an unhealthy air quality warning in the Santa Clarita Valley and San Gabriel Mountains.

See also
2020 California wildfires

References

Wildfires in Los Angeles County, California
2020 California wildfires